"Stone Cold Crazy" is a song written and performed by British rock band Queen for their 1974 album Sheer Heart Attack. The song is the eighth track on the album. Although the song was not released as a single at the time, it was performed live at almost every Queen concert from 1974 to 1978. "Stone Cold Crazy" is included on the band's 1992 compilation album, Classic Queen.

Sound
"Stone Cold Crazy" is known for its fast tempo and heavy distortion, thus being a precursor to speed metal. Music magazine Q described "Stone Cold Crazy" as "thrash metal before the term was invented". In 2009, it was named the 38th best hard rock song of all time by VH1.

DRUM! called it an "early blisteringly fast song", describing Taylor's performance as "straight-up punk-rock drumming. [...] In essence, Taylor's groove is a double-stroke roll split between his bass drum and snare drum with some cool accents played on his crash cymbals. Taylor later re-enters with a dramatic and decidedly non-punk fill to restart the groove."

Personnel 

 Freddie Mercury – lead vocals and backing vocals
 Brian May – guitars, backing vocals
 Roger Taylor – drums, backing vocals
 John Deacon – bass guitar

Remixes
Three different remixes were created in 1991. The first two, by Michael Wagener, were issued on different pressings of the 1991 Hollywood Records Sheer Heart Attack remaster, and on the Encino Man soundtrack. The third one, by Trent Reznor, was released on several promo CDs in 1991/1992 and 1999. The Wagener remixes are not very different from the original and feature slight remixing of the backing track. Reznor's version mixes the Queen sound with the industrial metal sound of Nine Inch Nails. Reznor's remix includes studio sound bites from Queen at the beginning and end of the track. It was intended for inclusion as the ninth track on the cancelled 1992 Hollywood Records compilation BASIC Queen Bootlegs.

Metallica version

Metallica covered the song as their contribution to the 1990 compilation album Rubáiyát: Elektra's 40th Anniversary. This cover version was later used as a B-side of their "Enter Sandman" single and subsequently won a Grammy Award; it also appeared on their covers/B-sides album Garage Inc. The Metallica version of the song is more aggressive than the original; they also slightly altered the lyrics, adding two uses of the word "fuck" and changing the more humorous lines for more violent lyrics.

James Hetfield performed the song with Queen & Tony Iommi of Black Sabbath (singing Metallica's altered lyrics) at the Freddie Mercury Tribute Concert. Metallica also played the song as an encore during their 1991–93 Nowhere Else to Roam tour; it appears on the live CD Live Shit: Binge & Purge and the 2009 live DVD Français Pour une Nuit.

Other uses
The song is featured in the music video games Guitar Hero: Metallica and Rock Revolution, as well as downloadable content for Rock Band 3 and Rocksmith. It also appeared on the soundtrack of the 2021 Disney movie Cruella, where the opening verse underscores a young Cruella de Vil hijacking a car.

See also
33rd Annual Grammy Awards

References

External links
 (with James Hetfield and Tony Iommi)
Lyrics at Queen official website

1974 songs
1990 singles
1992 singles
Elektra Records singles
EMI Records singles
Grammy Award for Best Metal Performance
British hard rock songs
British heavy metal songs
Hollywood Records singles
Metallica songs
Music videos directed by Bruce Gowers
Queen (band) songs
Song recordings produced by Roy Thomas Baker
Songs written by Brian May
Songs written by Freddie Mercury
Songs written by John Deacon
Songs written by Roger Taylor (Queen drummer)
Thrash metal songs